Prince Turki may refer to:

Turki I bin Abdul-Aziz Al Saud (1900–1919), first son of King Abdul-Aziz and Crown Prince of Najd
Turki II bin Abdul-Aziz Al Saud (1934–2016), son of King Abdul-Aziz and member of the Sudairi Seven
Prince Turki Al-Faisal (1945-), former Director General of Al Mukhabarat Al A'amah and former ambassador to the United Kingdom and the United States
Prince Turki bin Talal (1968), the fourth son of Talal bin Abdul-Aziz
Turki bin Abdullah Al Saud (1971), embroiled in the 1Malaysia Development Berhad scandal
Turki bin Saud bin Abdul Aziz (1953), captain of the Saudi National Snooker team